Lioprosopa microrrhoda is a species of snout moth in the genus Lioprosopa. It was described by Turner in 1923, and is known from Australia.

References

Moths described in 1923
Anerastiini